Thetford Township, is a civil township of Genesee County in the U.S. state of Michigan.  The population was 7,049 at the 2010 census, a large decrease from 8,277 at the 2000 census.

Communities
 Thetford Center is an unincorporated community in the township at Center and Vienna Roads.
Whitesburg, or Whitesburgh, is an unincorporated community in the township on Vassar Road, north of Scott Road and south of Dodge Road. It formerly had a post office and a railroad station.

History

On January 15, 1836, Pine Run Post Office was opened and renamed to Thetford on December 26, 1844. East Thetford Post Office opened on Dec 15, 1855 on Vienna Road west of Belsay Road.

On August 2, 1861, East Thetford Post Office was rename Thetford Center. Whitesburgh Post Office was opened on March 14, 1866. While on April 12, 1867, the Thetford Post Office was closed.

On March 28, 1873, the Whitesburgh Post Office was moved to and renamed Rogersville in Richfield Township. By 1873, the settlement of Henpeck came into existence at the four corners of sections 12, 14, 23 and 24, the intersections of Belsay and Vienna Roads. For township school district 8, the school was then located here. Thetford Center Post Office returned to its previous name, East Thetford, on June 9, 1873. The Rogersville office returned on November 16, 1895 to Whitesburg only to return to Rogersville on June 12, 1897. On July 12, 1898, the Thetford location was reestablished.

Both Thetford post offices were closed on August 30, 1902. Rogersville was discontinued on August 30, 1919.

Modern era
In 2001, the township began a police department by funding it from the general fund budget. The township board hired a part-time police Chief Thomas Kulcher at the time. Kulcher went on medical leave then resigned in 2007. A temporary police administrator was hired in Vienna Township Supervisor Anthony McKerchie, who then hired two part-time officers. A 1 mill levy to increase department staff was placed on the November 2007 ballot only to increase anti-police department sentiment and the levy failed at the ballot. In December 2008, McKerchie resigned. At a March 2008 board meeting, some residents called on the trustees to close the police department given the township was facing a $100-thousand deficit for the budget that was up for approval and greater presence of sheriff's deputies and State Police troopers.

On Monday November 27, 2017, the northern loop set of municipalities, including Thetford, began receiving water from the Karegnondi Water Authority pipeline and treated by Genesee County Drain Commission Water and Waste Division.

In 2008, the township police department started participating in the Defense Logistics Agency's Law Enforcement Support Office (LESO) surplus equipment program. By 2015, the department had received through the program 450 valued at more than $1.1 million. Township Trustee Stan Piechnik and Thetford Township Supervisor Gary Stevens requested an inventory and storage location. This was also augmented by an audit that indicated that this equipment should be accounted for in an inventory. Per Piechnik and Stevens Police Chief Robert Kenny had not aided in this effort such that the duo started looking for the equipment themselves as Piechnik claims that the surplus equipment were being delivery to friends of Kenny. After assuming they had permission in May 2017 to be on private property to look for the equipment, the duo were given a citation by Kenny for trespassing. Kenny also handled the investigation, but the charges where dismissed by the township attorney. LESO contacted the township to indicate an investigation was ongoing into the township's participation. Stevens then requested the Genesee County Sheriff to investigate. By December 24, 2017, a group of residents included Eugene Lehr, who was storing 20 LESO items on his property, had filed language for recall petitions for Piechnik and Stevens with language clarity hearing set for December 27. The weekend after a township board on April 16, 2018 that had an heated exchange between Lehr and Stevens, equipment began showing up at the township offices. On April 26, 2018, the Sheriff's Office conducted a warranted search of the police department. On May 7, 2018, an employee and father of the township clerk quit causing a dispute such that the township offices were close soon after opening. In June 2018, an envelope with $4,700 was found with the LESO equipment being moved, so the conduct of the chief was placed on its late June meeting. With Kenny unable to attend, a special meeting was called for July 2, 2018. With only three board members attending, the special meeting was canceled. One of the special meeting attendees then confronted and threatened Stevens the next day at the township offices. July 10 was the deadline for the recall petitions with no word if any were turned in the county clerk-register office. Steven planned to call another special meeting the week of July 16, 2018. While no additional special meeting was called, the board voted at the late July meeting to place a proposal on the ballot whether or not the township resident want their own police department. With the need to hold hearings and approve the ballot language, the township attorney advised them they did not have enough time and discontinue the effort. Kenny was then arrested on August 22 on two five year charges, embezzlement and obstruction of justice, and arranged the next day. A special meeting was called for August 24 to decide if to place him on leave.

Geography

Demographics
As of the census of 2000, there were 8,277 people, 2,975 households, and 2,299 families residing in the township. The racial makeup of the township was 94.42% White, 2.91% African American, 0.69% Native American, 0.24% Asian, 0.51% from other races, and 1.23% from two or more races. Hispanic or Latino of any race were 1.87% of the population.

There were 2,975 households, out of which 37.2% had children under the age of 18 living with them, 61.4% were married couples living together, 11.5% had a female householder with no husband present, and 22.7% were non-families. 18.0% of all households were made up of individuals, and 4.9% had someone living alone who was 65 years of age or older.  The average household size was 2.77 and the average family size was 3.12.

In the township the population was spread out, with 26.9% under the age of 18, 9.0% from 18 to 24, 31.4% from 25 to 44, 24.7% from 45 to 64, and 7.9% who were 65 years of age or older.  The median age was 36 years. For every 100 females, there were 99.8 males.  For every 100 females age 18 and over, there were 97.3 males.

The median income for a household in the township was $47,175, and the median income for a family was $50,378. Males had a median income of $41,533 versus $25,884 for females. The per capita income for the township was $21,057.  About 5.8% of families and 7.4% of the population were below the poverty line, including 9.6% of those under age 18 and none of those age 65 or over.

Education
Thetford Township is served by five separate public school districts.  The majority of the township is served by Clio Area School District to the west in Clio.  Most of the southern portion of the township is served by Mount Morris Consolidated Schools to the southwest in Mount Morris.  A very small portion of the southeast corner is served by the Genesee School District, and very small portions of the eastern boundary are served by LakeVille Community Schools in Otisville.

References

Townships in Genesee County, Michigan
1842 establishments in Michigan
Populated places established in 1842
Townships in Michigan